Pristimantis roseus is a species of frog in the family Strabomantidae.
It is endemic to Colombia.
Its natural habitat is tropical moist lowland forests.
It is threatened by habitat loss.

References

roseus
Endemic fauna of Colombia
Amphibians of Colombia
Amphibians described in 1918
Taxonomy articles created by Polbot